Rizal, officially the Municipality of Rizal (Subanen: Benwa Rizal; Chavacano: Municipalidad de Rizal), is a 5th class municipality in the province of Zamboanga del Norte, Philippines. According to the 2020 census, it has a population of 15,052 people.

Geography

Barangays
Rizal is politically subdivided into 22 barangays. Sitios Mercedes, San Roque, and Mauswagon became barrios in 1955.

Climate

Demographics

Economy

References

External links
 Rizal Profile at PhilAtlas.com
 [ Philippine Standard Geographic Code]
 Philippine Census Information

Municipalities of Zamboanga del Norte